Sun Remarketing, Inc. (originally Cook's, Inc. before 1983) was a retail company that specialized in reselling old Apple Computer software and hardware. It was founded by Robert L. "Bob" Cook in 1979.

Apple Lisa
In 1985, Sun Remarketing purchased between 5,000 and 7,000 unsold Apple Lisa computers from Apple Computers after the latter had discontinued it in September that year. The company had also acquired 3,500 unsold Apple III computers and thousands of used and broken Lisas from surrounding businesses in the same year. Sun sold roughly thousands of these consigned Lisas between 1985 and 1989, the company modernizing the machines by retrofitting them with 800-KB 3.5-inch floppy disk drives and 20-MB hard drives. Sun began reselling Apple's Macintosh line of computers in 1988, including Macintosh Plus, Macintosh SE, and Macintosh II, after years of having only sold the Lisa, Apple II, and Apple III. In September 1989, Apple took the remaining 2,700 in their warehouse (which they had consigned to Sun) and buried them at a landfill in Utah.

Sun Remarketing bought the MacWorks XL emulator from Apple in the 1980s to spur sales of the Lisa computers by making them able to run Macintosh applications.  Following the introduction of the Macintosh Plus by Apple with its enhanced 128K ROM, many new Macintosh applications no longer worked under MacWorks XL.  To clear its remaining inventory, Sun Remarketing took the bold step of underwriting the development of a new emulator called MacWorks Plus which fully supported the 128K ROM on the Lisa hardware, and packaged it together as the Lisa Professional.

Demise
Sun Remarketing was also known locally within Cache Valley as one of the first commercial internet service providers in Northern Utah, but did not take advantage of the situation. In 2006, Sun Remarketing was bought out by Cherokee Data, a computer wholesaler in Oklahoma.

A second company using the name Cherokee Data Solutions (aka CDS) is unrelated and unaffiliated with either Cherokee Data or Sun Remarketing.

Notes

External links
 Sun Remarketing 1991–1992 Catalogue
 Lisa/Macintosh XL Do-it-yourself Guide published by Sun Remarketing 
 Sun Remarketing Lisa ads at Vectronics Apple World

1983 establishments in Utah
2006 disestablishments in Utah
American companies established in 1983
American companies disestablished in 2006
Computer companies established in 1983
Computer companies disestablished in 2006
Defunct computer companies of the United States
Defunct software companies of the United States